George R. Nelson (May 22, 1927 – August 25, 1992) was an American set decorator. He won an Academy Award and was nominated for three more in the category Best Art Direction.

Selected filmography
Nelson won an Academy Award for Best Art Direction and was nominated for three more:
Won
 The Godfather Part II (1974)
Nominated
 The Brink's Job (1978)
 Apocalypse Now (1979)
 The Right Stuff (1983)

References

External links

1927 births
1992 deaths
American set decorators
Best Art Direction Academy Award winners
Emmy Award winners